Berlin is an unincorporated community in Bracken County, Kentucky, 30 miles south of Cincinnati.

Variant names were Pleasant Ridge and Hagensville.

Notable people
John M. Robsion, represented Kentucky in both the United States Senate and the United States House of Representatives.

References

Unincorporated communities in Bracken County, Kentucky
Unincorporated communities in Kentucky
1830 establishments in Kentucky